Thalleulia is a genus of moths belonging to the family Tortricidae.

Species
Thalleulia gracilescens Razowski, 2004
Thalleulia ochreorufa Razowski & Wojtusiak, 2008
Thalleulia pondoana Razowski & Wojtusiak, 2009

Etymology
The genus name refers to the relation with other Euliini, plus the prefix thall (meaning a branch or descendant).

See also
List of Tortricidae genera

References

 , 2005, World Catalogue of Insects 5
 , 2004, Acta Zoologica Cracoviensia 47 (3-4): 249–261.
 , 2009: Tortricidae (Lepidoptera) from the mountains of Ecuador and remarks on their geographical distribution. Part IV. Eastern Cordillera. Acta Zoologica Cracoviensia 51B (1-2): 119–187. doi:10.3409/azc.52b_1-2.119-187. Full article: .

External links
tortricidae.com

Euliini
Tortricidae genera